ITC Avant Garde Gothic is a geometric sans serif font family based on the logo font used in the Avant Garde magazine. Herb Lubalin devised the logo concept and its companion headline typeface, and then he and Tom Carnase, a partner in Lubalin's design firm, worked together to transform the idea into a full-fledged typeface.

The original designs include one version for setting headlines and one for text copy. However, in the initial digitization, only the text design was chosen, and the ligatures and alternate characters were not included.

The font family consists of five weights (four for condensed), with complementary obliques for widest width fonts.

When ITC released the OpenType version of the font, the original 33 alternate characters and ligatures, plus extra characters were included.

Elsner+Flake also issued the ligatures and alternate characters separately as Avant Garde Gothic Alternate.

Cold Type versions
ITC Avant Garde was never cast into actual foundry type, appearing first only in cold type.  Alphatype, Autologic, Berthold, Compugraphic, Dymo, Star/Photon, Harris, Mergenthaler, MGD Graphic Systems, and Varityper all sold the face under the name Avant Garde, while Graphic Systems Inc. offered the face as Suave.

Digital versions

ITC Avant Garde Gothic Pro
It is an OpenType variant of the original ITC Avant Garde Gothic, plus a suite of additional cap and lowercase alternates, new ligatures, unicase glyphs. It supports ISO Adobe 2, Adobe CE, Latin Extended character sets.

In addition, the obliques are altered from the original, where optical corrections are no longer used.

ITC Avant Garde Mono
It is a monospaced version designed by Ned Bunnel in 1983.

Digital version was produced by Elsner+Flake. The family consists of 4 fonts in 2 weights (bold and light) in 1 width, with complementary italics.

William Sans LET
William Sans LET is a very similar font, but the "regular" typeface is known as "Plain 1.0".

Derivatives
ITC Lubalin Graph is a slab-serif version of ITC Avant Garde, also designed by Lubalin.

Uses

Miscellaneous
 Main font used for the Eurovision Song Contest 2011, including the slogan and voting scoreboard.
 Used as the logo for GM Goodwrench until the brand was renamed GM Certified Service in 2011.
 Rock Band video games, one through three, use the font for its menus. In the first game, the alternative characters are mainly used.
 Used prominently in the title and gameplay of the video game Control.
 Used in title sequence of Stranger Things for the actors' and actresses' names fading in and out.

 Used in the opening and closing credits of the Back To The Future trilogy.

 Used in the opening and closing credits of Beethoven and Beethoven’s 2nd.

 Used in the opening and closing credits of National Lampoon’s Vacation and European Vacation.

 Used in general signage for the defunct Walt Disney World Resort attraction, ExtraTERRORestrial Alien Encounter.

Used in Twice’s logo since 2015.

Similar

 URW Gothic L is a similar font with identical metrics, intended for use as a replacement for ITC Avant Garde in the PostScript Base 35 fonts for the Ghostscript program. The font has since been released under free and open source terms.
 TeX Gyre Adventor is an open-source extension of the above font adding many new characters, and special alternate glyphs.

See also
 Century Gothic
 Futura (typeface)
 Avant Garde (magazine)

References

External links

 ITC Classics: ITC Avant Garde Gothic Pro
 What's Hot From ITC: October 2005
 Type Trading Card #11
 ITC Avant Garde Gothic Font Family - by Herb Lubalin, Tom Carnase (renewed reference)
 Paratype: ITC Avant Garde Gothic font
 FontShop: Avant Garde Gothic Alternate
 ITC Avant Garde Mono - now a suspended page
 Adobe - ITC Avant Garde Gothic Std Full Family

Geometric sans-serif typefaces
Newspaper and magazine typefaces
Photocomposition typefaces
Digital typefaces
International Typeface Corporation typefaces
Typefaces drawn by Team ’77